The First Ohio General Assembly was the initial meeting of the Ohio state legislature, composed of the Ohio State Senate and the Ohio House of Representatives.  It convened in Chillicothe, Ohio, on March 1, 1803, and adjourned April 16, 1803. This General Assembly coincided with the first year of Edward Tiffin's first term as Ohio Governor.

Background
Under Ohio's first constitution, State Senators were elected to two year terms. For the first class, half were elected for one year and half for two years. Members of the House were elected for each term. The Constitution was written in November, 1802, and submitted to the U S Congress. Elections for the first session were held in January, 1803. The apportionment of legislative districts was based on the 1802 Ohio Constitution, in section 7 of the Schedule. Subsequent sessions would be elected each October, and meet the first Monday of December.

State Senate

Districts
For the first session, the constitution apportioned  four senators for Hamilton County, one senator for Clermont County, one senator for Adams County, two senators for Ross County, one senator for Fairfield County, two senators for Washington County, one senator for Belmont County, two senators for Jefferson County, and one senator for Trumbull County.

Members

Ohio House of Representatives

Districts
For the first session, the constitution apportioned  eight representatives for Hamilton County, two representatives for Clermont County, three representatives for Adams County, four representatives for Ross County, two representatives for Fairfield County, three representatives for Washington County, two representatives for Belmont County, four representatives for Jefferson County, and two representatives for Trumbull County.

Members

Major events

In joint session, state officers were elected: William Creighton, Jr. as Ohio Secretary of State, William McFarland as Ohio State Treasurer and Thomas Gibson as Ohio State Auditor.

John Smith and Thomas Worthington were elected United States Senators, with no record of vote made.

In joint session, local judges and three Ohio Supreme Court judges, Return Jonathan Meigs, Jr., Samuel Huntington, and William Sprigg, were elected.

Major legislation
Eight new counties were erected during this session:
 Butler detached from Hamilton
 Columbiana erected from parts of Jefferson and Washington
 Franklin detached from Ross
 Gallia from Ross
 Greene from parts of Hamilton and Ross
 Montgomery from Hamilton
 Scioto from Adams
 Warren from Hamilton

Existing territorial laws were recognized as in force, if not specifically invalidated.

See also
 List of Ohio state legislatures

Notes

References

External links

Ohio legislative sessions
Ohio